The Allan Herschell Company specialized in the creation of amusement rides, particularly carousels and roller coasters. The company manufactured portable machines that could be used by traveling carnival operators. It was started in 1915 in the town of North Tonawanda, just outside Buffalo, New York, USA.

History

Previous companies
Herschell, with James Armitage, created the Armitage Herschell Company in 1873. In 1883, his son William traveled to London to meet former Limonaire Frères employee Eugene de Kleist. Backed by Armitage Herschell, in 1888, de Kleist set up band-organ production in North Tonawanda, founding the North Tonawanda Barrel Organ Factory. The company produced a range of barrel-organ based products, suited for all ranges of fairground attraction.

Armitage Herschell remained in operation until the early 1900s. The company carved many portable carousels, made simple in style. Surviving steam riding galleries are located in Mississippi and Maine. In 1901, Herschell left the company due to financial complications, thus allowing de Kliest to buy the pair out, and seek new investment from his association with Rudolph Wurlitzer.

Herschell created the Herschell Spillman Company with his in-laws, the Spillmans. Herschell Spillman started out creating and carving carousels in a traditional style, but later branching out to create larger park machines, such as elaborate carousels with many types of animals. Surviving carousels can be found in California, Michigan, and Maryland.  The Herschell–Spillman Motor Company Complex at North Tonawanda was listed on the National Register of Historic Places in 2013.

The company later dropped Herschell's name and was known as the Spillman Engineering Company. The company continued to make the same style of carousels, though later it focused more on horses with a few menagerie-styled machines. Surviving carousels can be seen in North Carolina and the Strong National Museum of Play in Rochester, New York.

Allan Herschell Company
The last company Herschell created was his own, competing with the Spillman Engineering Company, in 1915. Herschell specialized in horses with rigid poses and portable machines, which enabled them to be packed and shipped easily between towns. Herschell produced over 3,000 carved wooden carousels, which were shipped all over the United States and Canada, as well  Mexico, South Africa, and India.

The factory, bought in 1915, is located on Thompson Street in North Tonawanda. It is one of the last factory complexes in the United States to contain the production of wooden carousels. The complex was expanded to meet the growing company's needs. The building has a large carving shop, a woodworking shop, a paint shop, a storage area, an upholstery shop, a machine shop, and a roundhouse where the carousels were assembled and tested.

Herschell did not create just carousel rides, but expanded to include rides made for children and adults. He thought up the concept for rides specialized for small children, called "Kiddieland". Twister, Hurricane, Flying Bobs, and the Sky Wheel were thrill rides that catered towards adults.

The company moved to Buffalo, New York, in the 1950s, and in 1970, it merged with rival amusement park company Chance Manufacturing of Wichita, Kansas.

Herschell Carrousel Factory Museum
The Herschell Carrousel Factory Museum, at the original factory site on Thompson Street, opened to the general public in July 1983, with a full operational carousel from 1916. The first floor of the factory has been opened up to provide exhibits and demonstrations. Different programs are offered, such as woodcarving of various skill levels, guided tours, and a summer lecture series. Special programs, such as the Youth Volunteer Program and Neighborhood Partners Program, are offered to young people and local elementary-school children.

Surviving Allan Herschell Company rides

Carousels

Trains

 G-12  gauge miniature train
 G-16  gauge miniature train
 S-16 "1865"  gauge miniature train
 S-24 "Iron Horse"  gauge miniature train

Other rides
 Caterpillar, at Canobie Lake Park, Salem, New Hampshire, US
 Caterpillar, at Heritage Park Historical Village, Calgary, Alberta, Canada
 Looper, at Knoebels Amusement Resort, Elysburg, Pennsylvania, US

List of roller coasters

As of 2019, Allan Herschell Company has built 185 roller coasters around the world.

References

 "Major Carousel Builders and Carvers (Page 3 of 3) | An Introduction by Brian Morgan | NORTH TONAWANDA" National Carousel Association 24 Nov 2008

External links

 New York Heritage - Allan Herschell Ride Archive

Amusement ride manufacturers
Roller coaster manufacturers
Culture of Buffalo, New York
North Tonawanda, New York
Manufacturing companies established in 1915
1915 establishments in New York (state)
Manufacturing companies disestablished in 1970
1970 disestablishments in New York (state)
Carousel manufacturers
American companies disestablished in 1970